Barbara Baehr (born Hoffmann; 25 February 1953) is a German research scientist, entomologist,  arachnologist, and spider taxonomist. She has described over 400 new spider species, mostly from Australia. She is originally from Pforzheim, Germany.

Education and work 
Barbara Baehr obtained both her Staatsexamen and PhD in Zoology / Ecology at the University of Tübingen, Germany.

She worked as a scientific associate at the Bavarian State Collection of Zoology in Munich, Germany, from 1984 to 1998. During this time she also taught invertebrate zoology at the Ludwig Maximilian University of Munich (LMU) from 1996 to 1998, and conducted spider excursions for students.

Following several research visits to Australia (Western Australian Museum, Perth, 1994; Queensland Museum, Brisbane, and Australian Museum, Sydney, 1999), she took a research fellow position at the Queensland Museum in January 2000. Her work there focused on an interactive key to spider subfamilies, and was funded by the Australian Biological Resources Study.

Her subsequent research emphasized on the taxonomy of the ant spider family Zodariidae, the long-tailed bark spider family Hersiliidae and the long-spinnereted ground spider family Prodidomidae (since transferred to Gnaphosidae as the subfamily Prodidominae).

Publications

Filmography 
The Nature of Things (TV Series documentary). Herself – Queensland Museum
 Tarantula: Australia's King of Spiders (2005) ... Herself – Queensland Museum

References 
 

1953 births
Living people
Arachnologists
German arachnologists
20th-century German zoologists
German taxonomists
Women taxonomists
German women biologists
21st-century German women scientists
21st-century German zoologists